Kiuruvesi Airfield is an airfield in Kiuruvesi, Finland,  north of Kiuruvesi town centre.

See also
List of airports in Finland

References

External links
 VFR Suomi/Finland – Kiuruvesi Airfield
 Lentopaikat.net – Kiuruvesi Airfield 

Airports in Finland